Isaiah "Ike" Charlton (born October 6, 1977) is a former professional Canadian football linebacker and currently the defensive backs coach for the Toronto Argonauts of the Canadian Football League (CFL). As a player, he spent most of his professional career playing for the Winnipeg Blue Bombers of the CFL. He was drafted by the Seattle Seahawks in the second round (52nd overall) of the 2000 NFL Draft. He played college football at Virginia Tech.

Charlton has also been a member of the Jacksonville Jaguars, New York Giants, Oakland Raiders, New England Patriots, Detroit Lions, and Montreal Alouettes.

Early years
Charlton was born in Orlando, Florida and played high school football at Dr. Phillips High School.  He played offense and defense, but mainly quarterback his senior season.

Professional career
He has spent time with the Seahawks (2000–2001), the Jaguars (2002), NY Giants (2003) and the Raiders (2004) where he did not make the final roster cut. Charlton was cut by the Raiders in September 2004, and joined the Patriots in February 2005 for the 2005 season.

Charlton signed with the Winnipeg Blue Bombers of the Canadian Football League on October 13, near the end of the 2005 CFL season and, besides a break in 2007, when he attended the Detroit Lions training camp, has remained with the Blue Bombers. He re-signed as a free agent with Winnipeg on February 17, 2009, after receiving a matching offer from the Hamilton Tiger-Cats.

On August 2, 2010, Charlton was released by the Blue Bombers.

On October 19, 2010, the Montreal Alouettes signed Charlton to the practice roster.

NFL statistics

Coaching career
Coached for Freedom High School in Orlando, Florida.

After guest coaching with the Calgary Stampeders and Edmonton Eskimos in 2012 and 2013 respectively, Charlton was hired as the defensive backs coach for the Ottawa Redblacks on December 20, 2013. He was a coach with Ottawa for four years and won his first Grey Cup championship in 2016.

On February 6, 2020, it was announced that Charlton was joining the Toronto Argonauts as the team's defensive backs coach.

References

External links
Official Website
Detroit Lions bio
New England Patriots bio
Winnipeg Blue Bombers bio

1977 births
Living people
American football cornerbacks
American players of Canadian football
Canadian football linebackers
Detroit Lions players
Jacksonville Jaguars players
New England Patriots players
New York Giants players
Oakland Raiders players
Players of American football from Orlando, Florida
Players of Canadian football from Orlando, Florida
Seattle Seahawks players
Virginia Tech Hokies football players
Winnipeg Blue Bombers players
Ottawa Redblacks coaches
Dr. Phillips High School alumni